is a passenger railway station located in the town of  Uchiko, Kita District, Ehime Prefecture, Japan. It is operated by JR Shikoku and has the station number "U09".

Lines
Only local trains serve the station. Connections with other services are needed to travel further east of Matsuyama on the line.

Layout
Iyo-Tachikawa Statio, which is unstaffed, consists of an island platform serving two elevated tracks. There is no station building, only a shelter on the platform for waiting passengers. Access to the island platform is by means of a tunnel under the elevated structure leading to a flight of steps. A bike shed is provided at the base of the elevated structure.

History
Iyo-Tachikawa Statio was opened by Japanese National Railways (JNR) on 3 March 1986. With the privatization of JNR on 1 April 1987, control of the station passed to JR Shikoku.

Surrounding area
 Japan National Route 56
 Uchiko Municipal Tachikawa Elementary School

See also
 List of railway stations in Japan

References

External links
Station timetable

Railway stations in Ehime Prefecture
Railway stations in Japan opened in 1986
Uchiko, Ehime